This is a list of members of the South Australian House of Assembly from 1944 to 1947, as elected at the 1944 state election:

 The election for the seat of Angas was postponed due to the death of a candidate. LCL candidate Berthold Teusner won the supplementary election on 10 June 1944.
 Victoria LCL MHA Vernon Petherick died on 14 August 1945. Labor candidate Jim Corcoran won the resulting by-election on 29 September.
 Burnside LCL MHA Charles Abbott resigned on 2 May 1946. LCL candidate Geoffrey Clarke won the resulting by-election on 22 June.
 Semaphore Labor MHA Albert Thompson resigned on 19 August 1946 in order to contest the federal seat of Hindmarsh at the 1946 federal election. Labor candidate Harold Tapping won the resulting by-election on 5 October.
 Port Pirie Labor MLA Andrew Lacey died on 24 August 1946. Labor candidate Charles Davis won the resulting by-election on 19 October.

Members of South Australian parliaments by term
20th-century Australian politicians